Annie, known popularly as Baby Annie, (born 31 March 2001) is an Indian actress who appears in Telugu films. She is known for the role of Mallamma in the 2011 period film Rajanna, for which she received a Nandi Award. She made her debut through Anukokunda Oka Roju alongside Jagapathi Babu and Charmi. Her other notable films include Swagatham, Athidi, Stalin and Ek Niranjan.

Early life
Annie was born and brought up in Hyderabad to Malayalam speaking parents.

Annie started her acting career at the age of 4 and till now she shared screen with many top actors of the Telugu Film Industry like Chiranjeevi, Mahesh Babu, Nandamuri Balakrishna, Jagapathi Babu, Gopichand, and Ram Pothineni, Ram Charan, Uday Kiran and Aadhi Pinisetty. She also acted in a Bhojpuri film titled Shiva directed by Dinesh Lal Yadav under Suresh Productions.

She has won three Nandi Awards, one for Trap (Telefilm) (2007),another for Gorintaku Serial (2010) and another for Rajanna (2011). She won Nandi Award for Best Child Actress-2011 and Filmfare Award for Best Supporting Actress – Telugu-2011 for the movie Rajanna.

Filmography

Films 
All films are in Telugu, unless otherwise noted.

Television

References

External links

2001 births
Living people
People from Hyderabad, India
Indian child actresses
Actresses in Telugu cinema
Nandi Award winners
Filmfare Awards South winners
CineMAA Awards winners
Santosham Film Awards winners